The statue of Paul P. Harris, founder of Rotary International, is installed in Mexico City's American Park, in Mexico.

References

External links
 

Monuments and memorials in Mexico City
Outdoor sculptures in Mexico City
Polanco, Mexico City
Sculptures of men in Mexico
Statues in Mexico City